Perins School (formerly named Perins Community School) is an academy, Sports College and secondary school in New Alresford, Hampshire, England.

Performance
Perins has been a well performing school, achieving GCSE pass rates well above the national average. 72% of pupils obtained five or more GCSES grade C or above including maths and English in 2009, compared with the national average of 47.6%. In 2000, OFSTED reported that pupils' attainment had risen from "above average" to "well above average".  In the 2010 OFSTED inspection report it was given outstanding status. In 2013, it was given good status.

Houses
The houses used to be named after space shuttles.
 Challenger
 Discovery
 Endeavour

However, in 2016, the new headteacher (Steve Jones) added a new house and changed the names of the existing ones. The changes and addition are as follows:
 Ignis house (fire in Latin) formerly Endeavour (red)
 Terra house (earth in Latin) formerly Challenger (green)
 Ventus house (wind in Latin) formerly Discovery (yellow)
 Aqua house (water in Latin) the new house (purple)

Buildings

Seven main buildings
 Pascal: (Media and  English classrooms and the LRC/library)
 Eliot: (Geography, Art, ICT and RE / Philosophy & Ethics classrooms, as well as the main staff room and other offices) - Eliot and Pascal were built in the 70s.
 Rousseau: The original school house  (Modern foreign languages and History classrooms, as well as the site management)
 Ibsen: (Music classroom and practice rooms)
 Newton: (Science 'laboratories '/classrooms and Prep rooms)
 Stephenson: (Technology classrooms. This consists of the resistant materials workshop classrooms; the Computing room for the technology department and the food tech and textiles rooms).
 The buildings' names are combined to create the acronym of the school's name, PERINS, and are consequentially in order as you move from the top to the bottom of the school.
 Turing: A new block behind Evolution, was built to accommodate the growing maths department. Upon completing  the new building, Pascal became entirely for the English department, construction began in late 2013 and was finished by the Summer Term of 2014.

Other buildings
 The Hub and Ibsen: (Drama studios and Music classroom)
 Evolution: (The gym, the dance studio and the PE theory classroom)
 School office: (The senior management staff have their offices here, as well as the main office, the finances office and the photocopying room)
 Connected to the school office: (Pastoral, Learning support and the PE office)
 Sports Hall: To the back of Stephenson, there is an additional building which holds what is known as the sports hall (this is where examinations and other events/activities are held, in addition to sporting activities)

Management

Head teacher
Since 2015, the headteacher has been Steve Jones.

Feeder schools
Cheriton Primary, Four Marks Primary, Ropley Primary, Preston Candover Primary, Sun Hill Junior School and Medstead Primary feed into Perins School.

Notable alumni
 Gina Beck, West End musical leading lady
 Alexa Chung, television presenter, former model, fashionista.
 Chris Geere, actor on BBC Drama series Waterloo Road playing the role of Matt Wilding.
 Kerry Howard, comedy actress and sister of Russell Howard, performed as Laura in the popular BBC Three comedy series Him & Her and Vicki in the 2009 BBC One sitcom Reggie Perrin.
 Russell Howard, stand up comedian Russell Howard's Good News and regular on BBC comedy series Mock the Week.
 Dan Kieran, author (Crap Towns) and travel journalist for The Times
 Derek Warwick Formula One racing driver

References

External links
 Perins School website
 Perins Community website
 OFSTED inspection report
 "Blair honours improved schools" article by the BBC describing Perins School's improved schools award.
 BBC report on Perins School
School information from the Hampshire County Council
Alresford action plan - facilities
thebiglotteryfund.org.uk

Academies in Hampshire
Secondary schools in Hampshire
New Alresford